The Trail of '98 is a 1928 American silent action-adventure/drama film featuring Harry Carey and Dolores del Río about the Klondike Gold Rush. The film was originally released by MGM in a short-lived widescreen process called “Fantom Screen“. The film is based on the 1910 novel by that title, written by Robert W. Service.

Cast
 Dolores del Río as Berna
 Ralph Forbes as Larry
 Karl Dane as Lars Petersen
 Harry Carey as Jack Locasto
 Tully Marshall as Salvation Jim
 George Cooper as Samuel Foote (The Worm)
 Russell Simpson as Old Swede
 Emily Fitzroy as Mrs. Bulkey
 Tenen Holtz as Mr. Bulkey
 Cesare Gravina as Henry Kelland (Berna's Grandfather)
 Doris Lloyd as Locasto's procurer
 E. Alyn Warren as Engineer
 Johnny Downs as Mother's boy (as John Down)
 Ray Hallor as Brother Jim
 Ray Gallagher as Brother Joe
 Francis Ford as Gold Commissioner's assistant (uncredited)
 Roscoe Karns as Man on ship (uncredited)
 Jacques Tourneur as Extra (uncredited)
 Lou Costello performed uncredited stunts for Carey and possibly even del Rio.

Production
The film was shot on location in Denver and The Great Divide, Colorado, Truckee, California, Dawson City, Yukon, Canada and in various locations in Alaska including Skagway and Copper River.

While shooting the rapids sequence, four stuntmen drowned in the Copper River, including Jerome Bauten, Howard Daughters, and Ray “Red” Thompson who trained horses for cliff dives.

DVD release
A complete print of the film exists with a synchronized musical score and sound effects, and it became available on DVD as part of Warner Bros.'s Manufacture-on-Demand DVD titles in March 2009.

See also
 Harry Carey filmography

References

External links
 
 
 
 Magnified Grandeur - The Big Screen, 1926-31, David Coles, 2001

1928 films
1928 drama films
1920s American films
American action adventure films
American action drama films
American adventure drama films
American black-and-white films
American silent feature films
Films based on works by Robert W. Service
Films directed by Clarence Brown
Films set in 1898
Films set in Alaska
Films shot in Alaska
Films shot in California
Films shot in Colorado
Films shot in Denver
Films shot in Yukon
Metro-Goldwyn-Mayer films
Silent American drama films
Surviving American silent films